Vaada may refer to:

Vaada (film), a 2005 Bollywood movie
Vaada, the Zionist Aid and Rescue Committee active in Hungary during the Holocaust
Vaadaa, 2010 Tamil film